Sir James Clendon Tau Henare,  (18 November 1911 – 2 April 1989) was a New Zealand tribal leader, military officer, farmer and community leader. He fought for four years with the Māori Battalion during the Second World War, was wounded at El Alamein, and with the rank of lieutenant colonel was the battalion's commanding officer when the war ended.

Of Māori descent, Henare identified with the Ngāpuhi iwi. He was born in Motatau, Northland, the son of Taurekareka Henare. He was educated at Sacred Heart College, Auckland and at Massey Agricultural College.

In the 1966 Queen's Birthday Honours, Henare was appointed a Commander of the Order of the British Empire, for services to the Māori people. In the 1978 New Year Honours, he was promoted to Knight Commander of the Order of the British Empire, for services to the community, especially Māori affairs.

Tau Henare, a member of parliament between 1993 and 2014, is his great-nephew.

References

1911 births
1989 deaths
New Zealand farmers
People from the Northland Region
Ngāpuhi people
New Zealand military personnel of World War II
New Zealand Māori soldiers
Māori politicians
New Zealand National Party politicians
New Zealand Companions of the Distinguished Service Order
New Zealand Knights Commander of the Order of the British Empire
New Zealand Army officers
Unsuccessful candidates in the 1963 New Zealand general election
Unsuccessful candidates in the 1951 New Zealand general election
Unsuccessful candidates in the 1949 New Zealand general election
Unsuccessful candidates in the 1946 New Zealand general election
Massey University alumni
People educated at Sacred Heart College, Auckland